Brett McLeod is an Australian television news reporter and presenter for Nine News.

Biography 
Prior to his second appointment as Nine News European correspondent, McLeod was a reporter and relief news presenter for Nine News Melbourne and Nine News. Brett also previously worked as journalist, presenter and News Director at 3AW before joining the network.

McLeod has worked in Radio as part of the program Danger: Low Brow, where he was known as Brett Duck. Created at Community radio 3RRR while McLeod was completing his Media degree at RMIT, the show was later successful in both the Breakfast and Drive timeslots at FOX-FM

He was the Nine Network's Europe correspondent between 2002–04, and has covered numerous major stories including the Boxing Day tsunami in Aceh, conflicts in Iraq, Afghanistan, East Timor, Bangkok and Beirut, and Victoria's Black Saturday fires.

Between 2005 and 2021, McLeod filled-in for Jo Hall as Melbourne's weekend presenter, and later Alicia Loxley. He was also a summer replacement for Peter Hitchener.

McLeod also filled-in on national news bulletins including Nine Morning News and Nine Afternoon News. McLeod also presented former bulletins Sunday Morning News and Nightline on many occasions. Brett was also a fill-in presenter on 3AW where he filled in for both Tom Elliott and Neil Mitchell.

In June 2021, McLeod was appointed as Nine News Europe correspondent. He commenced the role in September.

References

Living people
Year of birth missing (living people)
Nine News presenters
People educated at Penleigh and Essendon Grammar School
Television personalities from Melbourne